The By the Way Tour was a worldwide concert tour by the Red Hot Chili Peppers in support of their eighth studio album, By the Way.

A DVD of the August 23, 2003 concert in Slane Castle, titled Live at Slane Castle, was released after the tour ended.

Background
 The songs of By the Way sound more melodic than the previous funk-rock releases. This was made possible by John Frusciante, who wanted the album to have a more atmospheric soundscape. However, Flea disagreed with the approach the album was going, but felt that he wasn't heard. It reached the point that he almost quit the band after the album was released. Fortunately, Flea and Frusciante were able to reconcile, and the band were able to start the tour. After beginning the tour in Europe, the band played a concert at Ellis Island, titled "Pep Rally" and sponsored by K-Rock. The New York Post declared the show "one of the top concerts of the year." Other notable concerts in this tour include the May 20, 2002 concert the Madison Square Garden, which was reported by Kelefa Sanneh of The New York Times as an "extraordinary two-hour performance," and the 2003 Slane Festival concert, which was officially released as Live at Slane Castle.

Songs performed

Originals

Cover songs (used as intros or during jams unless otherwise noted)

Tour dates

Cancelled dates

Personnel
Anthony Kiedis – lead vocals
Flea – bass, trumpet, backing vocals, occasional lead vocals
John Frusciante – guitar, backing vocals, occasional lead vocals
Chad Smith – drums

Notes

References

Red Hot Chili Peppers concert tours
2002 concert tours
2003 concert tours